Polaschek is a surname. Notable people with the surname include:
 Devon Polaschek, New Zealand professor of psychology
 Martin Polaschek (born 1965), Austrian legal scholar and politician